Stogi is one of the administrative districts (dzielnica administracyjna) of the city of Gdańsk, Poland. The district is the central part of the Port Island (Wyspa Portowa).

Location 
The north of the quarter is bordered by the Bay of Gdańsk. From the east, it is bordered by the district of Krakowiec-Górki Zachodnie, from the south by Rudniki and from the west by Przeróbka.

From the south it is bordered by the Dead Vistula (one branch of the Vistula river).

History 
Heubude became a seaside resort by end of the 19th century. In 1914 it became part of the city of Danzig and in 1927 a tramway was built.

Gdańsk refinery and the shipyard Stocznia Jachtowa are located in the south. The exterior port of Gdańsk is located in the north: Port Północny (northern port since 1970) with coal terminal (1974), Naftoport with oil (1975) and LPG terminal (1998). DCT Gdańsk, the Deepwater Container Terminal was opened in October 2007.

Stogi-Przeróbka (Stogi z Przeróbką) had been an administrative district with a population of 18,614. In 2010 Przeróbka, famous for the Westerplatte, became an independent district.

Tourism 
Tourist attractions:
Stogi beach
Gdańsk Port Północny Lighthouse, 61 meters – not open for the public .

References

External links 

 Podział administracyjny Gdańska (Polish)
 gedanopedia.pl: Stogi (Polish)

Districts of Gdańsk